Tenuipalpidae, also called flat mites or false spider mites, are a family of mites, closely related to the Tetranychidae. They are reddish and slow-moving and normally feed near the midrib or veins on the underside of leaves. Several species, among them Raoiella indica, are important crop pests. Other common species include Acaricis urigersoni and the Brevipalpus species B. phoenicis, B. californicus, B. obovatus, and B. lewisi.

Genera
The family includes the following genera:

 Aegyptobia Sayed, 1950
 Afronychus M. K. P. Smith-Meyer, 1979
 Australopalpus Smiley & Gerson, 1995
 Brevipalpus Donnadieu, 1875
 Cenopalpus Pritchard & Baker, 1958
 Capedulia M. K. P. Smith-Meyer, 1979
 Coleacarus M. K. P. Smith-Meyer, 1979
 Crossipalpus Smiley, Frost & Gerson, 1996
 Cyperacarus Beard & Ochoa, 2011
 Dolichotetranychus Sayed, 1938
 Gahniacarus Beard & Ochoa, 2011
 Krugeria M. K. P. Smith-Meyer, 1979
 Larvacarus Baker & Pritchard, 1952
 Lisaepalpus Smiley & Gerson, 1995
 Macfarlaniella Baker & Pritchard, 1962
 Meyeraepalpus Smiley, Frost & Gerson, 1996
 Neoraoiella Mohanasundaram, 1996
 Obdulia Pritchard & Baker, 1958
 Obuloides Baker & Tuttle, 1975
 Pentamerismus McGregor, 1949
 Phyllotetranychus Sayed, 1938
 Phytoptipalpus Trägårdh, 1904
 Priscapalpus de Leon, 1961
 Pseudoleptus Bruyant, 1911
 Raoiella Hirst, 1924
 Raoiellana Baker & Tuttle, 1972
 Rarosiella Rimando, 1996
 Tegopalpus Womersley, 1940
 Tenuilichus M. Mohanasundaram, 1988
 Tenuipalpus Donnadieu, 1875
 Terminalichus Anwarullah & Khan, 1974
 Ultratenuipalpus Mitrofanov, 1973

References

 Baker, Edward J.; Tuttle, Donald M. & Abbatiello, Michael J. (1975): The False Spider Mites of Northwestern and North Central Mexico (Acarina: Tenuipalpidae). Smithsonian Contributions to Zoology 194: 1-23.
 Beard, J.J. & Ochoa, R. (2011). "New flat mite genera (Acari: Trombidiformes: Tenuipalpidae) associated with Australian sedges (Cyperaceae)." Zootaxa 2941: 1-37.
 Joel Hallan's Biology Catalog: Tenuipalpidae
 Mites and Ticks: A Virtual Introduction — Tenuipalpidae

Trombidiformes
Acari families